Lee Dong-Ha (born December 1, 1942) is a South Korean novelist.

Life
Lee Dong-Ha was born in Osaka, Japan and moved to Korea with his family after Korea's liberation from the Japanese. There, he grew up in Gyeongsan, North Gyeongsang Province. He later served as a professor at Chung-Ang University.

Work
His writing career began in 1966 when he won an award from a Seoul Newspaper. Some of the works he has authored include Toy City, a semi-autobiographical novel in three parts, and Shrapnel, a collection of short stories about post-war South Korea.

His works focus on the damage done to a nation that has endured the trauma of internecine strife and division by forces that were outside of its control. Even when economic success comes, it cannot overcome that trauma and the inevitable dissolution of thousands of years of tradition.

Works in Translation 
 A Toy City
 Shrapnel And Other Stories

Works in Korean 

 Composition 1", “White Landscape” (Hayan punggyeong)
 Calculations" (Gyesanhagi)
 “A Portrait of Today” (Oneurui chosang)
 “How to Climb Over the Alps” (Alpeuseureul neomneun beop)
 “Vacation and a Bonus” (Hyugawa bouneoseu)
 "A Summer Day” (Hail)
 “A Stone” (Dol)
 “Snow” (Nun) 
 “Bird” (Sae). 

Anthologies
 Toy City (Jangnangam dosi, 1982)
 Valley at Dark (Jeomun goljjagi, 1986),
 A Bright Warm Day (Balggo ttatteutan nal, 1987)
 A Study of Violence (Pongnyeok yeongu, 1987)

References 

South Korean novelists
Living people
1942 births
Academic staff of Chung-Ang University